Peter Gunn is a TV series.

Peter Gunn may also refer to:

Peter Gunn (actor) (born 1963), English actor
Peter Gunn (politician) (1864–1927), politician from Alberta, Canada
"Peter Gunn" (song), the theme music composed by Henry Mancini for the television show of the same name
Peter Gunn (film), a 1989 television film by Blake Edwards